The 91st Division Monument is an outdoor monument, erected at Fort Lewis, in the U.S. state of Washington, on May 30, 1930. The memorial includes six statues designed by Avard Fairbanks and a  shaft designed by architect John Graham Sr.

References

1930 establishments in Washington (state)
1930 sculptures
Military monuments and memorials in the United States
Monuments and memorials in Washington (state)
Outdoor sculptures in Washington (state)
Sculptures by Avard Fairbanks
Statues in Washington (state)